Rolando Magbanua (born March 17, 1985) is a Filipino professional boxer.

He is the current interim WBO Oriental bantamweight champion.

Boxing career 
Magbanua made his professional debut on January 20, 2007, defeating Joe Galamition at the NotreDame of Midsayap Gym in Midsayap, Cotabato, Philippines.

External links 
 

Living people
1985 births
Bantamweight boxers
Filipino male boxers
People from Cotabato